Stark is an unincorporated community in Stark County, Illinois, United States, located on Rock Island Trail State Park,  north of Princeville.

References

Unincorporated communities in Stark County, Illinois
Unincorporated communities in Illinois
Peoria metropolitan area, Illinois